Psyra is a genus of moths in the family Geometridae.

Species
Psyra angulifera  (Walker, 1866)
Psyra bluethgeni  (Pungeler, 1904)
Psyra boarmiata  (Graeser, 1892)
Psyra conferta  Inoue, 1983
Psyra crypta  Yazaki, 1994
Psyra cuneata  Walker, 1860
Psyra debilis  Warren, 1888
Psyra falcipennis  Yazaki, 1994
Psyra fulvaria  Yazaki, 1992
Psyra gracilis  Yazaki, 1992
Psyra moderata  Inoue, 1982
Psyra rufolinearia  Leech, 1897
Psyra similaria  Moore, 1868
Psyra spurcataria  (Walker, 1863)
Psyra trilineata  (Moore, 1868)

References
Natural History Museum Lepidoptera genus database

Ennominae